Matthew Guido DiBenedetto (born July 27, 1991) is an American professional stock car racing driver. He competes full-time in the NASCAR Craftsman Truck Series, driving the No. 25 Chevrolet Silverado for Rackley WAR. Prior to that, DiBenedetto competed full-time in the NASCAR Cup Series for seven years which included making the playoffs in 2020. He has also previously competed in the NASCAR Xfinity Series and what are now the ARCA Menards Series and ARCA Menards Series East.

Racing career

Early career
DiBenedetto first showed an interest in auto racing after receiving a little league trophy around age 8. His father, Tony, who raced an Opel Manta in SCCA and IMSA in the late 1970s and early 1980s, noticed he preferred watching automobile racing on television over baseball. DiBenedetto's father knew that another player on his son's little league team was competing in mini kart racing so he bought him a used kart which a young DiBenedetto drove to his first victory. He later moved up to the UARA-Stars series, racing late models. In 2007, DiBenedetto's family sold all their equipment due to financial stress, from then on starting in 2008 Dibenedetto drove for Fat Head Racing Driver Development Program in the UARA-Stars as a teammate to Darrell Wallace Jr., Brennan Poole, and FHR team owner Jamie Yelton. There, he caught the attention of Joe Gibbs Racing, and later ran in the NASCAR Camping World East Series for them.

Xfinity Series

Joe Gibbs Racing: 2009–2010, 2019

DiBenedetto made his NASCAR Nationwide Series debut in 2009 at the Memphis Motorsports Park and drove the No. 20 Pizza Ranch-sponsored Toyota for Joe Gibbs Racing. DiBenedetto raced part-time in the No. 20 car in 2010.

His first race of 2010 came at Nashville Speedway. DiBenedetto had a solid car and ran well all night. Eventually scoring a 10th-place finish. His next race came at Road America. While running 11th he had an axle problem due to running over the curbs too hard, and that led to him falling many laps down. DiBenedetto ran six races for Joe Gibbs in 2010, with two top-ten finishes.

Nine years after his last start in the series with JGR, he returned to the team in August 2019 for the Road America race. He led the most laps and was in second position, when he spun off the track on the final lap at the final corner of the race.

Multiple teams: 2012–2016
After being forced out of K&N Pro Series East team X Team Racing due to lack of sponsorship, DiBenedetto then joined The Motorsports Group midway through 2012 and ran as a start and park driver for seven races finishing 79th in points.

In 2013, DiBenedetto joined Vision Racing to drive the No. 37 car part-time in the Nationwide Series and also started and parked the few races he was in. Dibenedetto later looked back at the start-and-park time as valuable for the seat time it gave him, which paid off later in his career.

During the 2014 season's Subway Firecracker 250 at Daytona, DiBenedetto replaced Jeffrey Earnhardt in the No. 4 JD Motorsports Chevy during the first caution due to Earnhardt suffering a fractured collarbone in a motorcycle accident during the week. For the second race he joined The Motorsports Group, where he start-and-parked the No. 46 Chevrolet for 12 races and raced the rest with the No. 40. He scored two top-15 place finishes at Road America and Mid-Ohio. DiBenedetto finished a career-high 21st in points.

In 2016, he made his return in the Xfinity Series driving the No. 10 Camry for TriStar Motorsports at Fontana, where he started 33rd and finished 40th after starting and parking. At the Fall Texas race, he crashed into the outside wall in turn 4 ending in a concussion and not racing in the Cup race the following day.

Cup Series

BK Racing: 2015–2016

DiBenedetto moved up to the Sprint Cup Series in 2015. He was originally intended to drive the No. 83 Dustless Blasting and No. 93 Toyotas for BK Racing on a part-time basis; he split the No. 83 during the year with Camping World Truck Series driver Johnny Sauter. After Sauter drove the No. 83 in the Daytona 500, DiBenedetto failed to qualify in his first two attempts at Atlanta and Las Vegas before finally qualifying for his Sprint Cup debut at Phoenix. When Sauter eventually decided not to race at any other Cup race after the Daytona 500, DiBenedetto took over the No. 83 full-time and declared for ROTY contention.

At Martinsville Speedway during a practice session, DiBenedetto was involved in an incident with three-time NASCAR champion Tony Stewart. The incident occurred when DiBenedetto tried to merge on the track behind Carl Edwards and the gap closed ahead of him. With Stewart fast approaching down the backstretch, DiBenedetto moved up the track in turn three to let Stewart pass. "When I got to (turn) three I didn't want to hold him up, so I just pulled up high and let him go by," DiBenedetto told Foxsports.com. "I got completely out of his way, but that wasn't enough. He tried to wreck me a few times, brake-checking me and flipping me off around the whole track." After the incident, DiBenedetto called Stewart "an arrogant prick".

DiBenedetto returned full-time with BK Racing in 2016, though he ran the No. 93 for the Daytona 500 since Michael Waltrip was in the No. 83 for the race. At Daytona, DiBenedetto crashed with Chris Buescher on lap 92 in what Buescher called the "hardest hit of his career", though the two were not injured. In the Food City 500 at Bristol Motor Speedway, DiBenedetto finished sixth, a career-best at the time, his first career top ten and the first for BK Racing since Travis Kvapil's eighth-place finish at the 2012 Good Sam Roadside Assistance 500 at Talladega Superspeedway. He returned to the No. 93 for the Federated Auto Parts 400 at Richmond while Dylan Lupton drove the No. 83, while also driving the No. 93 at Talladega's Hellmann's 500 as Jeffrey Earnhardt was in the No. 83. DiBenedetto missed the AAA Texas 500 after suffering a concussion during the previous day's Xfinity Series race and was replaced by Earnhardt. He was cleared to return at the following race in Phoenix. For the season-ending Ford EcoBoost 400 at Homestead, he drove the No. 49 to promote the video game NASCAR Heat Evolution price change to $49.99.

On December 8, 2016, DiBenedetto announced he had parted ways with BK Racing. Two days later he announced that he would drive a single-car effort for Go Fas Racing in 2017. Go Fas is one of the charter teams and as a result, DiBenedetto would make every race in the No. 32 Go Fas Racing Ford Fusion.

Go Fas Racing: 2017–2018

In the 2017 Daytona 500, his first for Go Fas, DiBenedetto finished 9th for his second career top 10. Statistically, DiBenedetto has been Go Fas Racing's best driver since co-owner Frank Stoddard founding the team in 2011, with him picking up several top twenty and top thirty finishes. DiBenedetto had a great race in the 2017 Food City 500 when he picked up a top twenty finish, his best finish since Daytona. At the Monster Energy Open leading up to the All-Star Race, DiBenedetto drove a Reddit-sponsored car; he learned of the site when driver Josh Wise was voted into the 2014 All-Star Race by the community, who nearly voted DiBenedetto into the 2016 race. The community then repeated their near-feat by having another close call in the 2017 Monster Energy NASCAR All-Star Race. After the campaign, DiBenedetto remained an active member of the community, interacting with its users in the NASCAR subreddit regularly.

At the 2017 Brickyard 400, DiBenedetto qualified near the back of the field. Despite this, he managed to avoid the late-race melee to pick up another top ten finish for the No. 32, finishing 8th. Soon after the race, DiBenedetto, crew chief Gene Nead, and Go Fas extended their contract to the 2018 season, allowing DiBenedetto to remain in the No. 32 for 2018. However, Nead left for personal reasons in late February.

Before the spring ISM race, DiBenedetto reached out on Twitter that his team has no sponsors for that race and needed a last-minute sponsor. Denny Hamlin, Kevin Harvick and Darrell Waltrip began to donate money to fund a sponsor, and the team later received Zynga Poker sponsorship. Go Fas eventually launched #TeamBurrito, a program that allows fans to encourage businesses to sponsor the No. 32 car in exchange for various rewards. Later that season, in July, at Daytona, DiBenedetto drove the No. 32 Zynga Poker Ford Fusion to another top ten finish, this time 7th, for the team's best finish.

On September 7, 2018, DiBenedetto announced that he will not be returning to Go Fas Racing in 2019. On October 10, it was announced that DiBenedetto signed a two-year contract with Leavine Family Racing to drive the No. 95 Toyota Camry starting in 2019. The deal, which was a one-year contract with a possible extension, came after LFR failed to extend Kasey Kahne and after a deal with Daniel Hemric fell through to drive the No. 95 car.

Leavine Family Racing: 2019

In his first race with Leavine Family Racing, DiBenedetto nearly pulled off the victory at the 2019 Daytona 500. DiBenedetto took the lead midway in the race and led a race-high 49 laps before being collected in the Big One with less than 15 laps to go.

For Sonoma Raceway's Toyota/Save Mart 350, DiBenedetto drove a Darrell Waltrip tribute scheme resembling his 1974 car; the race was Waltrip's final as a commentator for Fox NASCAR before his retirement. In the race, DiBenedetto pitted off sequence, completing his stops before the two stages and again with 25 laps remaining to score a fourth-place finish.

On August 15, 2019, DiBenedetto announced via Twitter that Leavine Family Racing had informed him that he would be dropped from the team following the 2019 season. At the time of the announcement, DiBenedetto stood 23rd in the standings. Two days after the announcement, DiBenedetto led 93 laps at the Bristol Night Race, but damage after contact with Ryan Newman would cause him to lose the position to Denny Hamlin with 11 laps to go. DiBenedetto would go on to earn a career-best second-place finish.

Wood Brothers Racing: 2020–2021

On September 10, 2019, Wood Brothers Racing signed DiBenedetto to drive for the No. 21 Ford full-time for the 2020 season, following Paul Menard's announcement that he will retire from full-time racing after the 2019 season. DiBenedetto started the season with a 19th place finish at the 2020 Daytona 500, but he rebounded a week later to tie a career-best second place finish at Las Vegas.

In the later weeks of the regular season, DiBenedetto battled with seven-time Cup champion Jimmie Johnson and William Byron for the final spots in the playoffs. DiBenedetto would ultimately qualify for his first playoffs when he finished 12th in the regular-season finale at Daytona and edged out Johnson for the 16th and last seed by six points. He was eliminated following the third race of the opening round at Bristol. DiBenedetto tied his career-best finish of second the following week later at Las Vegas for the third time in his career and the second time in a row at the track; this time to Kurt Busch. DiBenedetto ended his first season with the Wood Brothers 13th in the final standings with a career-high 11 top tens.

DiBenedetto returned to WBR in 2021 in what would be his final season with the team as Harrison Burton would take over the No. 21 the following year. He missed the Playoffs and finished 18th in the final standings.

Craftsman Truck Series

Rackley WAR: 2022

On January 6, 2022, Rackley WAR announced that DiBenedetto would drive the No. 25 full-time in the NASCAR Camping World Truck Series for 2022.

At the NextEra Energy 250 at Daytona, in only his first Truck start, DiBenedetto dodged many wrecks en route to a tenth place finish, the second one ever for Rackley W.A.R.. He would follow with a sixth place finish at the Victoria's Voice Foundation 200 at Las Vegas. It was his second top ten in his second start, and the best finish ever for Rackley W.A.R. in the Truck series. 

DiBenedetto struggled the next few weeks falling out of the Top 10 in points with a 30th place at Atlanta Motor Speedway after hitting the wall on the first lap falling 11 laps down due to damage. He scored a 31st place finish the next week after running Top 10 late in the race before a rear gear failure ended it at Circuit of the Americas followed by a 15th place run at Martinsville Speedway then a 35th place finish at the 2022 Pinty's Truck Race on Dirt at Bristol Motor Speedway after getting stuck together with Austin Wayne Self's truck. He fell 2 laps down with a flat tire during the 2022 Dead On Tools 200 at Darlington Raceway but got back on the lead lap scoring 10th before he was sent back to 11th when Matt Crafton's penalty was appealed. He finished 7th at Kansas Speedway followed by a 10th at Texas Motor Speedway scoring his 4th Top 10 of the season. He would go on to score 2 more Top 10 finishes at Gateway International Raceway and Sonoma Raceway. In the 2022 Rackley Roofing 200 at Nashville Superspeedway, DiBenedetto was running in the Top 10 when ThorSport Racing driver Ty Majeski took Matt and 2 other trucks 4 wide coming into Turn 3 causing him and the 2 other trucks to crash ending DiBenedetto's day and putting him in a must win to make the playoffs. DiBenedetto after being interviewed was unhappy and said "Some of these guys race with such disrespect." On July 23, Rackley WAR announced that DiBenedetto would return to the No. 25 for the 2023 season. On October 1, DiBenedetto achieved his first national series win in the Chevrolet Silverado 250 at Talladega Superspeedway.

Personal life
DiBenedetto was born in Nevada City, California, to parents Sandy and Tony DiBenedetto, and raised in Grass Valley, California. He has three siblings, Austin, Katie, Kelley. Austin is a member of the United States Air Force.

In 2015, DiBenedetto married his childhood friend Taylor Carswell. They currently reside in Hickory, North Carolina. They own a dog named Brian.

In 2018, he made a cameo in the television series Lethal Weapon (S2, E13) as a character named Carl Edwards, which DiBenedetto noted was coincidental and not a nod to the driver of the same name.

In 2021, DiBenedetto was baptized by fellow Cup Series driver Michael McDowell.

Motorsports career results

NASCAR
(key) (Bold – Pole position awarded by qualifying time. Italics – Pole position earned by points standings or practice time. * – Most laps led. ** – All laps led.)

Cup Series

Daytona 500

Xfinity Series

Craftsman Truck Series

 Season still in progress
 Ineligible for series points

K&N Pro Series East

ARCA Racing Series
(key) (Bold – Pole position awarded by qualifying time. Italics – Pole position earned by points standings or practice time. * – Most laps led.)

References

External links

 
 

Living people
1991 births
People from Grass Valley, California
Racing drivers from California
NASCAR drivers
ARCA Menards Series drivers
American people of Italian descent
Joe Gibbs Racing drivers